Francis Marion Busby (March 11, 1921 – February 17, 2005) was an American science fiction writer and science fiction fan. In 1960 he was a co-winner of the Hugo Award for Best Fanzine.

Biography
Francis Busby was born in Indianapolis, the son of Francis Marion Busby and Clara Nye Busby. The family settled in Colfax, in the state of Washington during 1931 and Busby attended high school there. He subsequently attended Washington State College until he joined the National Guard. He was subsequently discharged and returned to college. He did not remain long, however, and enlisted in the U.S. Army on July 23, 1943, at Spokane, Washington.

Busby served the war as part of the Alaska Communication System, assigned to the island of Amchitka. At the end of World War II he was discharged from the army and returned to college to graduate as an engineer. He subsequently returned to the Alaska Communication System to work in a civilian role based in Seattle.

During 1954 Busby married Elinor Doub. He had one daughter, Michele. Together with his wife and others he published a fan magazine named Cry of the Nameless which won the Hugo Award for Best Fanzine in 1960.

Busby continued to work for the Alaska Communication System until 1971, when the organization was sold to private industry and renamed RCA Alascom and he took early retirement from the company.

From 1974 to 1976 Busby was Vice President of Science Fiction and Fantasy Writers of America. At the age of fifty he became a freelance science-fiction author. He wrote nineteen published novels and numerous short stories between 1973 and 1996.

Robert A. Heinlein in part dedicated his 1985 novel The Cat Who Walks Through Walls to Busby, and in part dedicated his 1982 novel Friday to Elinor.

Busby ceased writing fiction some time after 1996, claiming in an email:

How real the influence of the Thor Power Tool decision was on Busby's writing career is uncertain, considering a great many of his novels were written and published after it.

During November 2004 Busby was diagnosed with severe intestinal problems. He went into the Swedish Medical Center/Ballard Campus for surgery and suffered complications. He underwent further surgery before being moved to Health and Rehabilitation of Seattle, where he died on Thursday afternoon, February 17, 2005.

Bibliography

Series

Demu
 1. Cage a Man (1973)
 "The Learning of Eeshta" (1973) - short story; also appeared in collection Getting Home (1987)
 2. The Proud Enemy (1975)
 3. End of the Line (1980) - not published separately, but only in The Demu Trilogy
 The Demu Trilogy (omnibus) (1980) - includes all four titles (including first appearance of End of the Line)

Rissa Kerguelen and Bran Tregare

Rissa Kerguelen
 Rissa Kerguelen (aka Young Rissa) (1976)
 Rissa and Tregare (1979)
 The Long View (1976)
 Zelde M'Tana (1980)
 Renalle Kerguelen (2015, Kindle only)

Hulzein
 The Star Rebel (1984)
 Rebel's Quest (1984)
 The Alien Debt (1984)
 Rebel's Seed (1986)
 The Rebel Dynasty - Volume I (omnibus) (1987) - Contains Star Rebel and Rebel's Quest
 The Rebel Dynasty - Volume II (omnibus) (1988) - Contains The Alien Debt and Rebel's Seed

Slow Freight
 Slow Freight (1991)
 Arrow from Earth (1995)
 The Triad Worlds (1996)

Non-series novels
 All These Earths (1978); book version of the following linked stories:
 "Pearsall's Return", If, July/Aug. 1973
 "Search", Amazing, Dec. 1976
 "Nobody Home", Amazing, July 1977
 "Never So Lost…", Amazing, Oct. 1977
 The Breeds of Man (1988)
 The Singularity Project (1993)
 Islands of Tomorrow (1994)

Short-Story Collection
 Getting Home (1987) (for some stories, year of first appearance anywhere noted)
 "A Gun for Grandfather"
 "Of Mice and Otis"
 "The Puiss of Krrlik"
 "The Absence of Tom Leone"
 "Proof"
 "The Real World"
 "Tell Me All About Yourself" (1973)
 "Once Upon a Unicorn" (1973)
 "Road Map"
 "If This Is Winnetka, You Must Be Judy" (1974)
 "Three Tinks on the House"
 "The Learning of Eeshta" - Part of the Demu series, and also included in The Demu Trilogy (1980)
 "I'm Going to Get You" (1974)
 "2000½: A Spaced Oddity"
 "Time of Need"
 "Retroflex"
 "Misconception"
 "The Signing of Tulip"
 "Advantage"
 "Getting Home"

Other short stories
Busby wrote over 40 short stories, thus leaving over 20 still uncollected, including:
 "First Person Plural" (1980)
 "Backup System" (October 1981) appeared in "Isaac Asimov Science Fiction Magazine"
 "Wrong Number" (December 1981) appeared in "Isaac Asimov Science Fiction Magazine"

Anthologies containing stories by Busby
His work appeared in the following anthologies:
 Clarion III (1973) — "Road Map" 
 The Best Science Fiction of the Year 3 (1974) – "Tell Me All About Yourself"
 Universe 5 (1975) – "If This Is Winnetka, You Must Be Judy"
 100 Great Science Fiction Short Short Stories (1978)
 The Best of New Dimensions (1979)
 Universe 10 (1980) – "First Person Plural" 
 Heroic Visions (1983) – "Before the Seas Came" 
 100 Great Fantasy Short Short Stories (1984)

References

External links
 
 F.M. Busby in The Encyclopedia of Science Fiction
 F. M. Busby on the Spacelight science fiction author database
 F. M. Busby on Science Fiction and Fantasy Writers of America
 fmbusby.com
 F. M. Busby book-jacket art
The F. M. Busby Papers (7.5 linear feet) housed at the Eaton Collection of Science Fiction and Fantasy of the University of California, Riverside Libraries.

1921 births
2005 deaths
20th-century American novelists
American male novelists
American science fiction writers
American male short story writers
20th-century American short story writers
20th-century American male writers
United States Army personnel of World War II